Jacco Eltingh and Paul Haarhuis defeated the five-time defending champions Todd Woodbridge and Mark Woodforde in a rematch of the previous year's final, 2–6, 6–4, 7–6(7–3), 5–7, 10–8, to win the gentlemen's doubles title at the 1998 Wimbledon Championships.

Seeds

  Jacco Eltingh /  Paul Haarhuis (champions)
  Todd Woodbridge /  Mark Woodforde (final)
  Mahesh Bhupathi /  Leander Paes (second round)
  Ellis Ferreira /  Rick Leach (quarterfinals)
  Jonas Björkman /  Pat Rafter (semifinals)
  Donald Johnson /  Francisco Montana (third round)
  Yevgeny Kafelnikov /  Daniel Vacek (third round)
  Martin Damm /  Jim Grabb (third round)
  Patrick Galbraith /  Brett Steven (quarterfinals)
  Nicklas Kulti /  David Macpherson (quarterfinals)
  Mark Knowles /  Daniel Nestor (third round)
  Wayne Black /  Sébastien Lareau (semifinals)
  Joshua Eagle /  Andrew Florent (first round)
  Neil Broad /  Piet Norval (third round)
  Marc-Kevin Goellner /  David Prinosil (second round)
  Sandon Stolle /  Cyril Suk (third round)

Qualifying

Draw

Finals

Top half

Section 1

Section 2

Bottom half

Section 3

Section 4

References

External links

1998 Wimbledon Championships – Men's draws and results at the International Tennis Federation

Men's Doubles
Wimbledon Championship by year – Men's doubles